Maksim Sergeyevich Yakovlev (born 8 September 1991) is a Russian professional football player. He plays for FC Peresvet Domodedovo.

Club career
He made his Russian Football National League debut for FC Salyut Belgorod on 10 July 2012 in a game against FC Sibir Novosibirsk.

External links
 
 

1991 births
Sportspeople from Bishkek
Living people
Russian footballers
Association football midfielders
FC Salyut Belgorod players
FC Rotor Volgograd players
FC Orenburg players
FC Volgar Astrakhan players
FC Khimki players
FC Dynamo Stavropol players
FC Tolyatti players
FC Chayka Peschanokopskoye players
FC Mashuk-KMV Pyatigorsk players